Carl Riegel (6 January 1897 – 26 November 1970) was a German football midfielder who played for 1. FC Nürnberg.

Riegel joined Nürnberg in 1914 and went on to win four German football championships with the club. He was also capped seven times by the German national team between 1920 and 1923.

Honours
 German football championship: 1920, 1921, 1924, 1925

References

External links
 
 

1897 births
1970 deaths
Association football midfielders
German footballers
Germany international footballers
1. FC Nürnberg players